Ostron, also released as Joust, is a ZX Spectrum video game developed and released by Softek in 1983. It is a clone of the 1982 arcade video game, Joust.

Reception
Crash awarded Ostron a 72% rating, deeming it "a very enjoyable game, with good graphics and sound".

References

External links 
 

1983 video games
Europe-exclusive video games
Platform games
Video game clones
Video games developed in the United Kingdom
ZX Spectrum games
ZX Spectrum-only games